Krissadee Prakobkong (born January 16, 1984) is a Thai retired professional footballer who played as a left back.

International career

On the back of performing extremely well in the Thailand 1st Division, Krissadee was called up to the full national side in coach Peter Reid's first squad announcement. He was called up with 35 other players to the 2008 T&T Cup hosted by Vietnam. He made his debut against North Korea on October 28, 2008 in the T&T Cup, and was a member of the victorious T&T Cup 2008-winning squad.

International

Honours

International
Thailand
 T&T Cup: 2008

Club
Chiangrai United
 Thai FA Cup: 2017

References

External links
 Profile at Goal
https://us.soccerway.com/players/krissadee-prakobkong/287743/

1984 births
Living people
Krissadee Prakobkong
Krissadee Prakobkong
Association football fullbacks
Krissadee Prakobkong
Krissadee Prakobkong
Krissadee Prakobkong
Krissadee Prakobkong